Joan Puig i Elias (1898–1972) was a Catalan pedagogue and anarchist from Spain who continued the work of Francisco Ferrer. During the Spanish Civil War he was president of the New Unified School Council.

Biography 
Having been affiliated with the Confederación Nacional del Trabajo (CNT) from a young age, he put Francisco Ferrer Guardia's school model Escuela Moderna into practice, in 1921, while working at the Escuela Natura in the El Clot neighborhood of Barcelona. His pedagogy intended to educate not only reason but also feelings in constant contact with Nature. "Paedocentrism, the observation of nature and curiosity as the engine of learning" were intended to be the foundations of teaching at Escuela Natura.

At the outbreak of the civil war and the social revolution in 1936, he was president of the New Unified School Council (CENU, in Catalan Consell de l'Escola Nova Unificado) which extended secular and libertarian pedagogy throughout Catalonia. He organized a campaign against illiteracy and in five months opened a hundred new school groups with more than 60,000 children.

After the May Days of Barcelona in 1937, he was appointed (in 1938) Subsecretary of Public Instruction and Health (the Minister was Segundo Blanco, also member of the CNT).

In 1939, after the defeat of the Republicans, he was exiled to France and he joined the French Resistance.

In 1952 he went to Brazil, and lived in Porto Alegre where he published his book El hombre, el medio y la Sociedad. The Determinants of Individual Behavior (1970). He died in 1972.

References

Bibliography 

 
 
 
 

 

1898 births
1972 deaths
Anarchists from Catalonia
Educators from Catalonia
People from Bages
People from Porto Alegre
Anarcho-syndicalists